Stan Smith defeated Ilie Năstase in the final, 4–6, 6–3, 6–3, 4–6, 7–5 to win the gentlemen's singles tennis title at the 1972 Wimbledon Championships. It was his only Wimbledon singles title, and his second and final major singles title. Due to rain washing out the final Saturday when the men's singles final between Smith and Nastase was due to take place, the final became the first match in Wimbledon history to take place on a Sunday. Not until 10 years later in 1982 did Wimbledon men's singles finals start being deliberately scheduled to take place on a Sunday.

Two-time defending champion John Newcombe was prevented from participating due to the International Lawn Tennis Federation ban on World Championship Tennis-contracted players competing in its tournaments.

Seeds

  Stan Smith (champion)
  Ilie Năstase (final)
  Manuel Orantes (semifinals)
  Andrés Gimeno (second round)
  Jan Kodeš (semifinals)
  Pierre Barthès (fourth round)
  Bob Hewitt (first round)
  Alex Metreveli (quarterfinals)

Qualifying

Draw

Finals

Top half

Section 1

Section 2

Section 3

Section 4

Bottom half

Section 5

Section 6

Section 7

Section 8

References

External links

 1972 Wimbledon Championships – Men's draws and results at the International Tennis Federation

Men's Singles
Wimbledon Championship by year – Men's singles